Ardfinnan is a small village in County Tipperary in Ireland. It is situated on the River Suir and R665 regional road. The Catholic parish of Ardfinnan is made up of three areas: Ardfinnan, Ballybacon, and Grange. Ardfinnan is also a civil parish in the ancient barony of Iffa and Offa West. The village is located 14 kilometers from the town of Clonmel and six miles from Cahir via the R670 road. The population of the village is approximately 900 people.

Transport
During the week it is served five times a day in each direction by Bus Éireann route 245 linking it to Clonmel, Mitchelstown, Fermoy and Cork. At the weekend there are three buses each way.

7th century abbey 
Saint Finian Lobhar (or Finian the Leper) founded an abbey for Canons Regular of Saint Augustine with a leper colony here in the early 7th century, high up on the site of the now present castle, known as Fíonáin's height, where the village gets its name.  In 908, King of Munster Cormac mac Cuilennáin bequeathed one ounce of gold, one ounce of silver, his horses, armour and sword to the abbey.  The abbey was plundered and burnt by Cambro-Normans during the Norman Invasion of Ireland in 1178.

A Carmelite abbey was later built on the opposite side of the river valley, known as Lady's Abbey, of which its ruin is still extant after it was destroyed during the English Reformation.  There was also a monastery for Franciscan Friars, Third Order Regular.

Ardfinnan Castle

A prominent feature of the village is the Anglo-Norman Ardfinnan Castle, the sister castle to Lismore Castle and was built by Prince John of England in 1185 to guard the river crossing. The 13 arch bridge was started soon after the castle was completed. The castle has a long and varied history of owners and is inhabited to the present. The castle is a private residence and is not open to the public.

Economy

Mulcahy-Redmond & Co. 

The former Ardfinnan Woollen Mills of Mulcahy-Redmond & Co., which produced its renowned Ardfinnan tweeds and suitings was established in the village in March 1869.  It was built on the site of a former corn mill which had been in operation since before the Civil Survey of 1654 up until it was sold by the Prendergasts of Ardfinnan in the mid 19th century.  The woollen mills became a leading firm in Irish textiles and was of great benefit to the village of Ardfinnan, providing employment to over 220 workers at its peak and electricity for streetlights and homes in the surrounding area long before the Rural Electrification Scheme was introduced.  HM King Edward VII visited the mill in the 1900s.  It closed in 1973.

Developments
Ardfinnan was a location, used by Atari, for the manufacture of wooden video game arcade cabinets from 1974 to 1984. At its height 200 workers were building 2,000 arcade cabinets a month at the location just outside the village. The plant in Ardfinnan closed in 1989.

Insulation manufacturer, Moy Isover were also based in the village since 1974 before finally closing in 2008.	

In January 2017, €800,000 was allocated for essential remedial works on the bridge by the government. As a public safety initiative, a traffic light one way system has been in place on the bridge since the end of 2015 after significant structural damage was discovered.

Sport 
Ballybacon-Grange GAA is the local Gaelic Athletic Association  hurling club.

Ardfinnan GAA is the local Gaelic Athletic Association Gaelic football club. They were Tipperary county Gaelic football champions in 2005.

Ardfinnan Anglers have licensed fishing rights to approximately 15 km of river bank on the river Suir.  Brown trout and Salmon can be caught in these waters. The river banks are maintained annually by club members who perform the work voluntarily before the commencement of the annual fishing season.

See also
 List of abbeys and priories in the Republic of Ireland (County Tipperary)

References

External links
Ardfinnan.net Archived Website
Article on Ardfinnan

Towns and villages in County Tipperary
Civil parishes of Iffa and Offa West